The T Stock was a series of electric trains originally built in various batches by Metropolitan-Vickers and the Birmingham Railway Carriage and Wagon Company for the Metropolitan Railway in 1927–31 for use on electric services from Baker Street and the City to Watford and Rickmansworth, though rarely some worked on the Uxbridge branch.

History
The earlier batches were built from wood and sandwiched trailers of 1898–1923 vintage, however later batches were steel in construction and worked with new built trailers. As built the group has some variations in equipment, mostly to allow use with existing stock such as the Saloon and Ashbury trailers and leading to incompatibilities within the class, however upon transfer the London Transport this was rectified and the entire fleet largely standardized about 1938.

T stock never ran to Aylesbury, though latterly worked to Chesham and Amersham after electrification. Prior to this, trains destined to beyond Rickmansworth were hauled by Metropolitan Vickers Bo-Bo electric locomotives as far as Rickmansworth, where a changeover to steam traction occurred.

These electric multiple unit trains had slam doors with rounded tops, thought to be less prone to damage if accidentally opened in the tunnels north of Baker Street.

In the late 1940s coaches 2752 and 2707 were rebuilt as experimental air-door trailers number 17000 and 20000 respectively. The first (17000) employed an unusual seating layout with gangways on both sides of the car. The air doors were controlled manually by passengers with buttons to open and close them. In 1949 it was modified with a conventional centre gangway to match its second variant, and being renumbered 17001. The two cars were permanently coupled and remained in service until 1953, their work as prototypes for the A60 Stock being completed.

The 'T' stock was replaced from 1961 by the A60 and A62 Stock, with the final train running on 5 October 1962.

In 1961, two withdrawn driving motors were converted to sleet locomotives. These were numbered ESL118A and ESL118B, having previously been 2758 and 2749 respectively. After withdrawal, both units were preserved, eventually locating at the Spa Valley Railway but now moved to Quainton.

Equipment details
The first coaches of the first batch (1927) had Westinghouse brakes, Metro-Vickers control systems and MV153 motors; they were used to replace the motor cars working with Bogie Stock trailers that formed 'W' trains.

The rest of the coaches from the first batch had the same motor equipment but used vacuum brakes instead. They ran with converted Dreadnoughts of the 1920/23 batches to form 'MV' stock.

The second batch (of 1929) were very similar in terms of equipment to the first coaches of 1927 and were interchangeable. This batch included specially built trailers and when running with which were known as 'MW' trains; the W indicating Westinghouse Air Brakes were fitted.

The last batch (1931) were like the previous batch but had equipment by the GEC and used WT545 motors. They were found not to be as compatible as hoped, and remained segregated until the LPTB standardisation of Metropolitan Railway rolling stock.

When standardised, the MV stock trains were converted to air brakes. The Bogie Stock coaches in the W stock formations were withdrawn eventually and replaced by seven more converted Dreadnought coaches. Following a reshuffle this allowed 9×8 coach and 10×6 coach trains, which were then designated 'T' stock. 22 motor cars remained spare however, but by 1961 this had been reduced to six spare.

Fleet details

References

 Steam to Silver, J Graeme Bruce, 1970
 Underground Train File: Surface Stock 1933-1959, Brian Hardy, 2002
 Journals of the 'London Underground Railway Society
 Metropolitan Railway Rolling Stock, Snowdon, J.R., Wild Swan, 2001. 

T
Train-related introductions in 1927